Günther Zuntz (28 January 1902 – 3 April 1992), German-English classical philologist, professor of Hellenistic Greek and Bible scholar. He obtained a D.Phil. from the University of Marburg in 1928 and was later a professor at the University of Manchester.

Zuntz was born in Berlin in 1902. In 1933 he emigrated to England, because of racial persecutions.

Zuntz examined the Greek text of the Pauline epistles.

Works 
 
 Zuntz, G. Persephone: Three Essays on Religion and Thought in Magna Graecia. Oxford: Clarendon Press, 1971.

References 

1902 births
1992 deaths
German biblical scholars
Scholars of Greek language
German emigrants to England
Academics of the University of Manchester
University of Marburg alumni
Jewish emigrants from Nazi Germany to the United Kingdom